Misa Q'asa (Quechua misa table, q'asa mountain pass, literally "table mountain pass", Hispanicized spelling Mesa Jasa) is a mountain in the Andes of Peru, about  high. It is located in the Ayacucho Region, Lucanas Province, on the border of the districts of Aucara and Cabana. Misa Q'asa lies west of Misa Urqu and northeast of the archaeological site of Usqunta.

References

Mountains of Peru
Mountains of Ayacucho Region